The bishop and knight checkmate in chess is the checkmate of a lone king which can be  by a king, a bishop, and a knight. With the stronger side to move and with perfect play, checkmate can be forced in at most thirty-three moves from any starting position where the defender cannot quickly win one of the pieces. The exception is the "stalemate trap" (see below). These exceptions constitute about 0.5% of the positions. Checkmates are possible with the defending king on any square at the edge of the board but can be forced only from positions with different  or if the defending king is in a corner controlled by the bishop or on a square on the edge next to a corner; however, mate adjacent to the corners not controlled by the bishop is only two moves deep (with the same material), so it is not generally encountered unless the defending side plays inaccurately. Although this is classified as one of the four basic or elementary checkmates (the others being king and queen; king and rook; or king and two bishops against a lone king), it occurs in practice only approximately once in every 6,000 games.

Method

Overview 

It is assumed in this section that White has the bishop and knight.

Since checkmate can only be forced in the corner of the same color as the squares on which the bishop moves (the "right" corner), an opponent who is aware of this will try to stay first in the center of the board, and then in the "wrong" corner. Thus there are three phases in the checkmating process:

 Driving the opposing king to the edge of the board.
 Forcing the king out of the "wrong" corner to the "right" corner, if necessary.
 Delivering the checkmate.

Positions in this endgame fall into four categories:

 Positions which are stalemate, or in which White cannot prevent stalemate or the loss of one of their pieces, such as in the positions H and J (below). These form a significant minority, in almost all of which Black to play can immediately take a piece or irrecoverably fork the pieces or White to play has their pieces irrecoverably forked. Such positions are clearly drawn. All other positions can be won by White.
 Positions in which White can force mate on a square adjacent to the "wrong" corner, such as position K after 1...Kh8. These form a tiny minority. 
 Positions in which White can prevent the black king reaching the longest diagonal of the color opposite to that of the bishop, such as positions O–S. These form a substantial minority. In such positions White can force mate using Delétang's triangle method, described below.
 Positions in which the black king can reach the longest diagonal of the color opposite to that of the bishop, such as positions L–N. These are the majority, in which the general method beginning with Phase 1 as described below can be applied.
 
Checkmate is usually quicker from the third type of position than the fourth type, so White should usually aim for the former and Black the latter.

Phase 1

In the first phase, White uses their pieces to force the black king to the edge of the board. As noted above, White achieves mate more quickly by preventing the black king from reaching the longest diagonal of the color opposite to that of the bishop.

Here is an example of how the first phase can be accomplished from the position L.
1. Bg2 Kd4
2. Kd2 Ke5
3. Ke3 Kf5
4. Nd3 Sealing off the e5-square.
4... Kg5
5. Be4 White has a wall and will push the king into a corner, see diagram M.
5... Kf6 The black king is too close to the h8 corner.
[Editorial note: Seirawan's comment appears to be a misprint: the black king should try to avoid the h1 corner and head for the h8 corner. Thus 5...Kg4 would be worse. If instead the black king moves to the h-file White can play Kf4–f5 followed by Kf6 and Ne5 (in some order) reaching a position of type N on move 9.]
6. Kd4 
[Editorial note: The white king heads for the left hand side of the wall, but this checkmates more slowly by one move than 6.Kf4 heading directly for f6.]6... Ke67. Kc5 Ke78. Kd5 The black king now must decide where to go, so he goes to the h8 corner, where checkmate cannot be forced.8... Kf69. Kd6 Kf710. Ke5 Kg711. Ke6 Kg8[Editorial note: Here Black miscalculates the moves. White arrives at a position equivalent to N on move 13 but with Black to move. Had Black instead played 11...Kf8 or 11...Kh8, White would be in zugzwang at that point.]12. Ne5! Centralizing the knight and preparing to force the black king out of the h8 corner.12... Kf813. Kf6 Kg814. Nf7! 
Keeping the black king out of the h8 corner. Now White can force the king to the a8 corner (the "right" corner for checkmate) by one of the methods below, or by similar techniques.

Phases 2 and 3

 W manoeuvre 

The position on the right is one that typically arises after the first phase has been completed and the defender has headed to a corner opposite in color to that occupied by the bishop. The following method to push the king to the "right" corner is commonly given:1. Nf7+First White forces the king to leave the corner. The white bishop is positioned so that the next two moves, gaining control of g8, are possible.1... Kg8 2. Bf5A waiting move, forcing Black's king to move so White can play 3.Bh7, taking away g8 from the king.2... Kf8 3. Bh7 Ke8 4. Ne5The key to the standard winning method is the Nf7–e5–d7–c5–b7 movement of the knight as first demonstrated by Philidor in  L'Analyse des Échecs (1777), forming a "W" shape. Now there are two possible defenses:

 Defense A: 4...Kf8 
Black clings to the "safe" corner, but loses more quickly.5. Nd7+ Ke8 6. Ke6 Kd8 7. Kd6 Ke8 8. Bg6+ Kd8 9. Bf7 Kc8 10. Nc5 (continuing the knight's manoeuvre)10... Kd8 11. Nb7+ Kc8 12. Kc6 Kb8 13. Kb6 (now the king is in the correct position, a knight's move away from the right corner) 13... Kc8 14. Be6+ Kb8 15. Bd7 (now the defending king is confined to the right corner, and checkmate can be given)15... Ka8 16. Nc5 Kb8 17. Na6+ Ka8 18. Bc6 Defense B: 4...Kd8 
Here, the defending king tries to leave the edge of the board. This holds out longer.5. Ke6 Kc7 6. Nd7! White continues the knight's W manoeuvre, even though Black's king has temporarily left the back rank.6... Kb7 7. Bd3!Black's king is now restricted to the correct-colored corner. The perimeter is bounded by a6, b6, b5, c5, d5, d6, d7, e7, f7, f8. White's subsequent moves tighten this area further.  7... Kc6 8. Be2 Kc7At this point several ways of continuing are possible, including the following two:

Continue the W manoeuvre
One continuation from the position after Black's eighth move is to continue the W manoeuvre of the knight, by bringing it to c5 and b7. Müller and Lamprecht give 9. Bf3 Kd8 10. Kd6 Ke8 11. Bh5+ Kd8 12. Bf7 Kc8 13. Nc5 Kd8 14. Nb7+ Kc8 15. Kc6 Kb8 16. Kb6 Kc8 17. Be6+ Kb8 18. Nc5 Ka8 19. Bd7 Kb8 20. Na6+ Ka8 21. Bc6# (the first checkmate diagram). However, the following improvement is possible 12. Nc5 after which Fine continues 12... Kc8 13. Be2 Kd8 14. Bb5 Kc8 15. Bd7+ Kb8 16. Kc6 Ka7 17. Kc7 Ka8 18. Kb6 Kb8 19. Na6+ Ka8 20. Bc6#    

Delétang's second triangle

Alternatively, from the position after Black's eighth move (with the irrelevant difference of the bishop on d3 instead of e2), Fine shows that Delétang's triangle method is equally quick: 9. Bb5 Kd8 10. Nb6 Kc7 11. Nd5+ Kd8 12. Kd6 Kc8 13. Ke7 Kb7 14. Kd7 Kb8 15. Ba6 (Delétang's third triangle) 15... Ka7 16. Bc8 Kb8 17. Ne7 Ka7 (17...Ka8 18.Kc7 Ka7 19.Nc6+ Ka8 20.Bb7#) 18. Kc7 Ka8 19. Bb7+ Ka7 20. Nc6#  

Delétang's triangle method
Delétang's triangle method produces checkmate by confining the king in successively smaller areas. In the first set of three diagrams, the king is confined inside the marked area and a corner in which the checkmate can occur is in the area. The king cannot escape the area nor attack the bishop or knight. The second set of three diagrams shows the triangles and how the bishop controls the hypotenuse of the triangle.
 

In the first net, all three pieces are required to confine the king. In the second net, only the bishop and knight are needed. In the third net, the king and bishop confine the king, allowing the knight to either checkmate or assist in the checkmate. The winning procedure consists of making the king move so that the bishop can reach the hypotenuse of the next smaller triangle.

Starting from the position of the first triangle, White wins:
 1. Bc2 (to push the king toward the corner)
 1... Ke3 (the king stays as close to the middle as possible)
 2. Kc1 (plan is to guard e2, probably from d1)
 2... Ke2 3. Bg6 (a waiting move)
 3... Ke3 4. Kd1 (guarding e2)
 4... Kf2 5. Kd2 Kf3 6. Kd3 (still guarding e2)
 6... Kg4 7. Ke3 Kh4 (preventing the bishop from going to h5)
 8. Kf4 Kh3 9. Bh5! (the bishop is on the hypotenuse of the second triangle)
 9... Kg2 10. Nc5 Kf2 11. Ne4+ Kg2 12. Bg4 (the second net)
 12... Kf1 13. Kf3 Ke1 14. Ke3 Kf1 15. Kd2 Kg2 16. Ke2 Kg1 17. Bh3! (the hypotenuse of the third triangle)
 17... Kh2 18. Bf1 Kg1 19. Ng5 (preparing to guard h2)
 19... Kh1 20. Kf2 Kh2 21. Nf3+ Kh1 22. Bg2#A stalemate trap

A stalemate trap, not mentioned in endgame treatises, was noted by the American master Frederick Rhine in 2000 and published in Larry Evans' "What's the Best Move?" column in Chess Life magazine. In the position in diagram AD, after 1...Nb6+ 2.Kb7?? Nd5, Black would be well on their way to setting up Delétang's second triangle. However, White draws instantly with 2.Kd8! (diagram AE), when the only way for Black to save their bishop is to move it, resulting in stalemate. The position (diagram AE) would also be drawn if the knight were at a7 or e7 instead. Rhine later used this discovery as the basis for a "White to play and draw" composition. A stalemate idea essentially identical to that shown in diagram AE occurs at the climax of a study by A. H. Branton, second prize, New Statesman, 1966. (White: king on c1; Black: king on c3, knight on a3, bishop on d1), though it may have been known even earlier.

From the position in diagram AD, instead of 1...Nb6+??, Black would win quickly by threatening mate on d8 by 1...Na5, e.g. 2.Kd8 Ba4 3.Kc8 Bd7+ and the white king is forced to b8 with mate in 6. 

History and methods
A method for checkmate applicable when the lone king is in the corner of the opposite color from the bishop (the "wrong" corner, where checkmate cannot be forced), was given by Philidor in the 1777 update to his famous 1749 treatise, L'Analyse des Échecs. He called attention to the route of the knight now identified by the letter W. Another method, known as "Delétang's Method" or "Delétang's Triangles", applicable when the lone king is unable to reach the longest diagonal of the color opposite to that of the bishop, involves confining the lone king in a series of three increasingly smaller triangles, ultimately forcing it into a corner of the same color as the bishop (the "right" corner). Some of the ideas of this method date back to 1780, but the complete system was first published in 1923 by Daniel Delétang. The method as propounded is not optimal, but it is relatively simple; so long as White has trapped the king behind the diagonal in a reasonable number of moves, it will lead to mate before the fifty-move rule takes effect. His "second triangle" or "middle triangle" occurs also in the analysis of play with the king in the corner of opposite color to the bishop shown in Fine's and Philidor's analyses. Fine's analysis improves on Philidor's. Neither method is necessary to complete the mate.

Importance

Opinions differ among chess authors as to whether or not a player should learn this checkmate procedure.

Jeremy Silman omits the bishop-and-knight checkmate in his book (despite including the rarely seen checkmate with two bishops) because he has encountered it only once, and his friend John Watson has never encountered it. Silman said, "Mastering it would take a significant chunk of time. Should the chess hopeful really spend many of his precious hours he's put aside for chess study learning an endgame he will achieve (at most) only once or twice in his lifetime?" Relatedly, International Master Jonathan Hawkins reported only ever encountering the position once in a game.

On the other hand, while Grandmaster Andy Soltis concedes that he has never played this endgame and most players will never have it in their career, he argues that learning the checkmate teaches techniques that can be applied elsewhere. James Howell includes the bishop-and-knight checkmate in his book, saying that he has defended against it three times and that it occurs more often than the checkmate with two bishops; he omits the latter from his book. Finally, the checkmate occurred in at least one very notable case: in Tal Shaked's victory over Alexander Morozevich in the penultimate round of the 1997 World Junior Chess Championship. Shaked knew the correct mating pattern, and his victory catapulted him to becoming World Junior Champion, whereas a draw would have prevented him from winning the title.

Examples from games
The comments in this section are mostly editorial additions and not included in the cited references.

Karttunen vs. Rasik 

The ending of the game between Mika Karttunen and Vitezslav Rasik at the 2003 European Chess Club Cup shows the knight's W manoeuvre. From position Y1, it continued:   Checkmate follows after 104...Kg8, 105.Nh6+ Kh8 106.Bd4#. Black could have held out a move longer with 92...Kg7, and 98.Bd8 would have been faster for White. 

Ljubojević vs. J. Polgár 

Position Y2 is from a blindfold game between Ljubomir Ljubojević and Judit Polgár at the 1994 Amber chess tournament. Play continued:84. Kd6 Kf6? (Better is 84...Nf4. The white king should run towards a1 so the black king should follow it towards that corner.) 85. Kc5 Ke5 86. Kc4 Bd5+ 87. Kd3 Nf4+ 88. Ke3? (White can resist about seven moves longer by 88.Kc3) 88... Be4 89. Kd2 Kd4 90. Kc1 Kc3 91. Kd1 Bc2+ 92. Ke1 Kd3 93. Kf2 Ke4 94. Kg3 Bd1 95. Kf2 Nd3+ 96. Kg3 Ke3 97. Kh4 Kf4 98. Kh3 Ne1 99. Kh4 Ng2+ 100. Kh3 Kf3 101. Kh2 Kf2 102. Kh3 Be2 103. Kh2 Bg4 104. Kh1 Ne3 105. Kh2 Nf1+ 106. Kh1 Bf3# Grandmasters failing to mate
Delivering checkmate is difficult if the technique has not been studied and practiced. Even grandmasters, including GM Vladimir Epishin and Women's World Champion GM Anna Ushenina, have obtained the endgame but failed to win it.

In the Kempinski vs. Epishin game, both players made suboptimal moves. The superior side was unable to win and ended up stalemating several moves after the inferior side could have claimed a draw under the fifty-move rule.

Robert Kempinski (2498) – Vladimir Epishin (2567) [E60]
Bundesliga 0001 Germany (5.3), 07.01.2001

From position Z:127. Kf3 Bc5 128. Ke4 Kc4 129. Kf5 Kd5 130. Kf6 Bd6 131. Kf7 Ne5+ 132. Ke8 Ke6 133. Kd8 Nf7+ 134. Kc8 Kd5 135. Kb7 Kc5 136. Ka6 Bc7 137. Kb7 Kd6 138. Ka6 Kc6 139. Ka7 Nd6 140. Ka8 (position AA) Bd8?140...Nc4 141.Ka7 Nb6 142.Ka6 Bb8 is optimal.141. Ka7 Kb5 142. Kb8 Kb6 143. Ka8 Nb7 144. Kb8 Bc7+ 145. Ka8 Kc6 146. Ka7 Nc5 147. Ka8 Nd7 148. Ka7 Nb6 149. Ka6 Bb8!Reaching the same position Black could have forced earlier (see previous note).150. Ka5 Kc5?150...Nd5 is optimal.151. Ka6 Bd6? 152. Kb7 Kb5 153. Ka7 Kc6 154. Ka6 Bb8!Reaching the same position as after Black's 149th move.155. Ka5 Nd5!Belatedly finding the winning move he missed five moves ago.156. Ka6Objectively best was 156.Ka4.156... Bc7?Missing 156...Nb4+.157. Ka7 Bb6+ 158. Kb8 Bc5 159. Ka8 Nc7+ 160. Kb8 Nb5 161. Ka8 Kb6 162. Kb8 Na7 163. Ka8 Ka6 164. Kb8 Bb6 165. Ka8 Nb5 166. Kb8 Nd6 167. Ka8 Kb5 168. Kb8 Kc6 169. Ka8 Bc7 170. Ka7 Nb7 171. Ka8 Nc5 172. Ka7 Bb6+ 173. Ka8 Bc7 174. Ka7 Nd7 175. Ka8 Bd6 176. Ka7 Nb6 177. Ka6 Bb8 178. Ka5 Bc7 179. Ka6 Nc8 stalemate After the basic king, bishop, and knight versus king position arrived, White was kind enough to allow his king to retreat to the last rank in only six moves. But Black seemed to try to mate White in the wrong corner. Black eventually found a winning line, up to a point, but then failed to find 156...Nb4+ and instead tried again to mate in the wrong corner.

In the Anna Ushenina vs. Olga Girya game, played in the Geneva tournament of the FIDE Women's Grand Prix 2013–2014, White started Phase 2 correctly but missed two chances to finish it.

From position AB:72... Ka1 73. Nd1 Ka2 74. Bc2 Ka1 75. Kc3 Ka2 76. Bb3+ Ka1 77. Ne3 Kb1 78. Nc2 Kc1 79. Ba2 Kd1 80. Nd4 Ke1 81. Kd3 Kf2 (position AC) 82. Bd5?White should have played this move in place of the previous move or should now continue the W manoeuvre with 82.Ne2! It looks at first as if the black king might run away with 82...Kf3 or 82...Kg2, but in either case 83.Be6 reins it in again. Playing Bd5 at this stage is six moves slower than continuing the W manoeuvre, but White can still continue to mate in the h1 corner by e.g. Ne6, Bc4 sealing the black king behind the b1–h7 diagonal and leading to Delétang's first net.82... Kg3 83. Ke3After this move, White cannot prevent the black king escaping the b1–h7 diagonal. The black king can play up the g-file to g6 and the white king has no option but to follow with opposition on the e-file to at least e5, otherwise the black king can escape to the third perimeter at f5 or f6.83... Kg4 84. Be4The black king can now escape to f6.84... Kg5 85. Kf3 Kf6 86. Kf4 Kg7 87. Kg5 Kf7 88. Kf5 Kg7 89. Bd5 Kh6 90. Ne6 Kh7 91. Kf6 Kg8 92. Nf4+ Kh8 93. Be4This wastes two moves because the knight needs three moves to reach e7 instead of one to reach g6. White should have immediately started the W manoeuvre along the h8–h1 edge, e.g. 94.Bf7 reproducing the position after White's move 77.93... Kg8 94. Nh3 Kh8 95. Ng5 Kg8 96. Nf7 Kf8 97. Bh7 Ke8 98. Bf5Quickest is to continue the W manoeuvre with Ne5, but White plans to control g8 with knight instead of bishop, which is three moves slower.98... Kf8 99. Nh6 Ke8Now 100.Be6 would seal the king behind the a2–g8 diagonal. White has time to relocate the knight to d3 reaching Delétang's first net.100. Nf7White instead abandons the idea.100... Kf8 101. Ne5 Kg8 102. Ng6On both preceding moves, playing the W manoeuvre along the h8–a8 edge would have been best.102... Kh7 103. Be6White could have reached this position in two moves after move 92.103... Kh6 104. Bg8 Kh5 105. Ne5 Kh4 106. Kf5 Kg3 107. Bc4?Missing a second chance to continue the W manoeuvre with 107.Ng4!. After White missed this opportunity, Black can now with best play stave off checkmate long enough for the 50-move draw to come into effect.

 107... Kf2 108. Kf4 Ke1 109. Ke3 Kd1 110. Bd3 Kc1 111. Nc4 Kd1 112. Nb6 Kc1 113. Na4 Kd1 114. Be4 Kc1 115. Bd3 Kd1 116. Nb2+ Kc1 117. Nc4 Kd1 118. Bg6 Kc1 119. Bf5 Kd1 120. Nb6 Kc1 121. Na4 Kd1 122. Nb2+As both players now have made fifty consecutive moves without a capture or pawn move, Black could claim the draw now by the 50-move rule. Girya played on for another four moves before actually taking the draw.122... Kc1 123. Nc4 Kd1 124. Kd3 Kc1 125. Kc3 Kd1 126. Bd3 ½–½Quotations
 "... I have seen how many chess players, including very strong ones, either missed learning this technique at an appropriate time or had already forgotten it." — Mark Dvoretsky.
 "Some masters have already gone back home red with embarrassment after failing or showing poor technique in the execution of this checkmate." — Jesús de la Villa.

See also
 Pawnless chess endgame

ReferencesBibliography'''

External links
There is a bishop and knight checkmate in a game between V. V. Ivanchuk and A. Morozevich in the last round of a tournament at Reggio Emilia on 6 January 2011:  (last-but-one game on page),  (click on text "Vassily Ivanchuk vs Alexander Morozevich" to get animated board-display version).
 Video explaining the bishop and knight checkmate
 Video by Majnu Michaud explaining the bishop and knight checkmate using Delétang's triangles
 Interactive bishop and knight checkmate practice
 K & B & N against K, Black resigned at 135th move Peter Svidler vs. Lê Quang Liêm (Tromsø World Cup 2013): Slav Defense

Chess endgames
Chess checkmates